"Stand Back" is the debut single from Australian band Roxus. The song was included on their debut album Nightstreet (1991). The song peaked at number 44 on the Australian ARIA Chart.

Track listing
 Vinyl / 7" single (LS 2078)
 "Stand Back" - 3:21
 "Spaghetti Wire"

Chart performance

References

External links
 "Stand Back" by Roxus
 Lyrics of this song - Stand Back

1989 debut singles
1989 songs
Roxus songs